Events from the year 1671 in Denmark.

Incumbents
 Monarch – Christian V

Events

 March – Charles Bertie (senior) is named British envoy-extraordinary to Denmark.
 September 20 – Princess Wilhelmine Ernestine is married to Charles, the heir of the Electorate of the Palatinate at Sophie Amalienborg in Copenhagen.

Undated
 Paul Kurtz completes the Crown of Christian V.
 Anointing of Christian V at Frederiksborg Castle.
 The Order of the Dannebrog is instituted, comprising only a single class of 50 noble knights, plus the Master of the Order, i.e. the Danish monarch, and his sons.
 Lambert van Haven is appointed General Building Master, as the first to hold this post, with overall responsibility for executing the king's architectural wishes.
 Abraham Wuchters is appointed Painter to the Danish Court.
 The titles Landgrave and Land Baron  are introduced as the highest noble ranks in Denmark with the creation of counties and baronies.
 The "King's New Square", Kongens Nytorv, is established in Copenhagen with inspiration from the Paris.
 The military Garnisons Cemetery is inaugurated outside Copenhagen's Eastern City Gate.
 Danish West India Company is founded and will settle on St. Thomas the following year, founding the Danish West Indies.

Births
 February 5 – Bartholomæus Deichman bishop (d. 1731).
 June 21 – Christian Detlev Reventlow, diplomat and military leader (1738)
 July 21 – Hendrick Krock, painter to the Danish Court (d. 1738)
 October 8 – Frederick IV, Duke of Holstein-Gottorp, Duke of Schleswig (d. 1702)
 October 11 – Frederick IV, king of Denmark (d. 1730)

Full date unknown
 Benoît Le Coffre, painter to the Danish Court (d. 1722)
 Morgan Bryan, grandfather of Rebecca Boone  /d. 1763

Deaths
 March 15 – Axel Urup, military engineer and commander (b. 1601)

References

 
Denmark
Years of the 17th century in Denmark